The Scottish Poetry Library is a public library specialising in Scottish poetry.  Since 1999, the library has been based at 5 Crichton's Close, just off the Canongate in Edinburgh's Old Town.

History and status
The library was founded in 1984 by poet Tessa Ransford. Tom Hubbard was its first librarian. The present Director, Asif Khan, was appointed from June 2016. Khan is supported by a team of librarians and specialist staff with expertise in collections management, engagement, learning, events, publishing and communications.

The SPL is a limited company with charitable status. From November 2020, its Board was co-Chaired by Gordon Munro and Charlie Roy. The SPL has status as a Creative Scotland Regularly Funded Organisation (RFO) with a remit to support audience development, literacy through reader development and creative writing classes with diverse groups, schools and public libraries, and to promote opportunities for writers and performers for showcasing their talents at home and abroad.

Programming and collaboration

The SPL’s work on wellbeing themes has included reminiscence activity supporting people with dementia in care settings, and the Tools of the Trade anthologies that are gifted to every graduating doctor, teacher, nurse & midwife in Scotland. In 2020, the SPL led on a mapping project of Scotland’s Creative Words for Wellbeing practitioners. This resulted in the SPL commissioning reader development and creative writing workshops with people experiencing long-COVID, along with classes for teachers, mothers and a partnership programme with Lapidus Scotland focusing on COVID-recovery and renewal.

In the international arena the SPL has partnered with Literature Wales and Poetry Ireland, as well as the cultural programmes of the Scottish Government Hubs in Dublin, Brussels, Paris, Berlin and London. Further afield, the SPL was commissioned by the British Council to engage with cultural organisations and artists in Quebec.

The SPL supports the Callum MacDonald Memorial Award for Scottish poetry pamphlets, presented in partnership with the Satire Literary Awards. In 2021, the library sponsored the Best Poetry Book category in the Gaelic Book Awards. The library is represented on a number of advisory and advocacy groups, including Literature Alliance Scotland, the Scots Language Resources Network and the RIVAL network for librarians and information professionals. The library supports professional development initiatives, including the Scottish Book Trust’s New Writers Awards scheme. In 2016, the SPL was recognised with a Creative Edinburgh Award for its diverse programming.

In 2020, the SPL relaunched its Ambassadors programme to promote its presence in the regions, and work produced in Scottish Gaelic and Scots languages. The first cohort of Ambassadors were Aoife Lyall, Ceitidh Campbell, Hugh McMillan and Thomas Clark.

The building

Since 1999, the library has been based at 5 Crichton's Close, just off the Canongate in Edinburgh's Old Town. The library building was designed by Malcolm Fraser Architects, and was shortlisted for Channel 4's "Building of the Year" in 2000. It has been described as "a poem in glass and stone", and was included in Prospect magazine's 2005 list of the 100 best modern Scottish buildings.

Further reading
 Hubbard Tom (1992), "Scandic Scots: Some Scots-Scandinavian Poetic Connections", in Hubbard, Tom (2022), Invitation to the Voyage: Scotland, Europe and Literature, Rymour, pp. 96 - 103,

References

External links
 

Scottish poetry
Academic libraries in Scotland
Libraries in Edinburgh
Tourist attractions in Edinburgh
Old Town, Edinburgh
1984 establishments in Scotland
Library buildings completed in 1999
Libraries established in 1984
Poetry organizations
Modern architecture in the United Kingdom